Special Delivery is a 1978 animated short film made at the National Film Board of Canada which won the Academy Award for Best Animated Short Film as well as first prize at Animafest Zagreb. It was directed by Eunice Macaulay and John Weldon. An English and a French-language version were released.

Plot
After Ralph dismisses his wife's orders to clear the snow from the front walk before he went out for the day, he finds his regular mailman dead on his front stairs, having slipped on the ice and broken his neck.  Fearing police investigations and potential wrongful death lawsuits from the letter carriers' union amongst other things, Ralph must go to great lengths to cover up the mailman's death while his wife comes to terms with her past.

Production
The film had a budget of $35,065.

References

Works cited

External links

Watch Special Delivery at NFB Web site

1978 films
1978 animated films
1970s animated short films
Best Animated Short Academy Award winners
Canadian animated short films
Films directed by John Weldon
National Film Board of Canada animated short films
Quebec films
1970s English-language films
1970s Canadian films